Archduchess Margaret of Austria (25 January 1567 – 5 July 1633), was an Austrian archduchess of the House of Habsburg.

She was the daughter of Maximilian II, Holy Roman Emperor by his wife Maria of Spain, daughter of Charles V, Holy Roman Emperor by his wife Isabella of Portugal.

Life
Born in Wiener Neustadt, Margaret was the fifteenth child and fifth daughter of her parents' sixteen children, of whom eight survived infancy. From early childhood, she was deeply influenced by her mother's strict Catholicism.
In 1582, Empress Maria returned to her homeland Spain permanently, taking her youngest surviving child Margaret with her, promised to marry Philip II of Spain, who had lost his fourth wife, her sister, Anna of Austria, in 1580.

Life as a nun
Margaret refused marriage to Philip II and took the veil under the name of Sister Margaret of the Cross as a Poor Clare nun in the Monastery of Santa Clara de las Descalzas Reales in Madrid.

Her mother was also resident in the convent until her death in 1603. Margaret was the dedicatee of the first published edition of the requiem which was composed for her mother's funeral by the composer and priest Tomás Luis de Victoria. Margaret died, aged 66, and was buried in her convent.

Ancestry

References

Richard Reifenscheid: Die Habsburger in Lebensbildern, Piper Verlag (2007).

1567 births
1633 deaths
Austrian princesses
16th-century House of Habsburg
17th-century House of Habsburg
16th-century Austrian women
17th-century Austrian women
16th-century Roman Catholic nuns
17th-century Roman Catholic nuns
Nobility from Vienna
Burials in Madrid
Daughters of emperors
Children of Maximilian II, Holy Roman Emperor
Poor Clares
Daughters of kings